The Meath Junior Football Championship is an annual Gaelic football competition contested by lower-tier Meath GAA clubs. The winner of this championship will be promoted to the Intermediate division. The winner also represents Meath in the Leinster Junior Club Football Championship. The 2021 Meath Junior Football Championship was won by St Vincent's, who defeated Dunsany in the final 1-4 to 0-6.

Competition format
Up until 1971, the Junior 'A' winners played against the Junior 'B' winners in the Junior Championship final, even though the teams involved in the final had played in different grades of football throughout the season.

From 2020 onwards, club reserve teams were not permitted to take part in the Junior Football Championship. The Junior 'B' Championship was abolished (with all first teams automatically promoted from it) and a separate Premier Football Championship for reserve teams was established.

History
Wolfe Tones went from this competition to Meath Senior Football Championship winners in the space of four seasons in the early 21st-century, featuring Meath player Cian Ward, whose emergence as one of Meath's "most exciting talents" coincided with this run, while 1996 All-Ireland Senior Football Championship-winning captain Tommy Dowd also joined the club around this time.

Qualification for subsequent competitions

Meath Junior Club Football Championship
The Meath JFC winners qualify for the Leinster Junior Club Football Championship. It is the only team from County Meath to qualify for this competition. The Meath JFC winners enter the Leinster Junior Club Football Championship at the __ stage. For example, 2019 winner Clann na nGael played in the Leinster JFC final, losing the game by a single point.

While 2015 winner Curraha won the Leinster JFC final.

Meath JFC winning clubs also put together a five-year continuous sequence of Leinster titles in the 21st-century, as follows: Clann na nGael (2007), Moynalvey (2008), Longwood (2009), Ballinabrackey (2010) and Ballivor (2011).

This followed a similar, earlier, three-in-a-row sequence of Meath JFC winners of corresponding Leinster titles, as follows: Nobber (2002), Wolfe Tones (2003) and Ratoath (2004).

All-Ireland Junior Club Football Championship
The Meath JFC winners — by winning the Leinster Junior Club Football Championship — may qualify for the All-Ireland Junior Club Football Championship, at which they would enter at the __ stage, providing they haven't been drawn to face the British champions in the quarter-finals.

The Meath JFC winning club representative won consecutive All-Ireland titles in the early 21st-century as follows: Nobber in 2003 and Wolfe Tones in 2004.

Meath Junior 'A' Football Championship

Meath Junior 'A' Football Championship top winners
Teams in bold are still currently in existence as football clubs.

Meath Junior Football Championship Roll of Honour
From the inaugural Junior B championship in 1958 until 1971, the winners of the Junior A Championship and the winners of the Junior B Championship would play in the Junior Championship final to determine promotion to the I.F.C. On many occasions, both teams were promoted.

 In the 1944 final, Walterstown were found to have fielded players from Dublin clubs. The title was awarded to Oldcastle.
 In the 1933 final, Pluxtown were found to have fielded unregistered players from Dalystown, Westmeath. The title was awarded to Navan Harps.

Meath Junior 'A' F.C. Divisional Roll of Honour

 1958 – The name of a Curraha substitute wasn't supplied to the referee. Match was later awarded to Clonard.

Meath Junior 'B' Football Championship
The Junior B Football Championship was abolished after 2019. All 'B' teams and St Paul's were incorporated into a new Premier Championship, while all other first teams competing in the Junior B Football Championship were regraded to the Junior Football Championship. The Junior B Championship was reintroduced in 2022.

References

3
Junior Gaelic football county championships
Recurring sporting events established in 1897